The Skyrunner World Series is an annual international championship of skyrunning (high altitude endurance races) and the official International Skyrunning Federation (ISF) race circuit for mountain running. Each year the Skyrunner World Series presents a global Sky Racing calendar, attracting mountain running athletes from almost every country.

History 
Skyrunning was founded in 1992 by Italian Marino Giacometti, President of the International Skyrunning Federation which sanctions the discipline worldwide. The SWS was launched in 2004 and has grown to represent the peak of outdoor running defined by altitude and technicality. In 2017, Migu Run, an advanced online and offline exercise and health management platform founded in China, became title sponsor of the Migu Run Skyrunner World Series.

Definition of a Skyrunner World Series Sky Race 
Skyrunning stands apart from other mountain running activities. The criteria of a SWS Sky Race are:
 Race Duration: Day-long races with a time limit of 16 hours.
 Race Distance: Sky Races feature distances from 22 km to 66 km to enable full intensity performance throughout the race.
 Race Values: Races are characterised by their technicality, speed, intensity and extreme terrain.

Altitude (average and maximum reached), peak reach, running on snow/glacier, grade II climbing difficulty and increased elevation percentage are other factors also taken into account when defining a Sky Race.

2019 rules and rankings
The 2019 Skyrunner World Series proposes two ranking systems. The single season ranking, introduced in 2019 and limited to the Skyrunner World Series, and the 52-week ranking which encompasses all races, including the Skyrunner National Series races.

The single season ranking 
In 2019, the Skyrunner World Series introduced the first single ranking system. The objective of the general ranking is to unify the circuits and key races to make the series even more competitive and define who is the best Skyrunner in the World; a Skyrunner being someone able to face any type of mountain with technicality, speed and intensity, and serves as a base to distribute the end of season bonus pool.

The 2019 Skyrunner World Series season runs from April to October. It consists of 15 races in 11 countries and concludes with the "SkyMasters", the end of season race open only to qualified athletes.

Athletes are ranked on their top 4 points results of the season, of which no more than 2 can be "SuperSky Races" - races rewarding twice as many points as a Sky Race, plus the SkyMasters points.

At each race, points will be attributed to the top twenty finishers in a symmetric manner for men and women according to the following grid:

The 52-week ranking 
The 52-week rolling ranking is a ranking based on results over the last 52 weeks. It includes the points earned in MRSWS and Skyrunner National Series and is updated every week. After 52 weeks, any result completely disappears.

End of season bonus pool 
The end of season bonus pool increased from €66,000 in 2018 to €75,000 in 2019, split equally between the top 10 ranked male and female athletes of the season. To be eligible for the end of season bonus pool, athletes must participate in a minimum of four races, at least two must be Sky Races and start at the SkyMasters race.

2019 Race Calendar

2018 Ranking system 
For the 2018 season, three rankings were published: Sky Classic, Sky Extra and Overall.

Sky Classic races were 22 km to 50 km long with 7.5% average elevation and a 1,000m difference of min/max. altitude. The Sky Classic ranking took into account the best five results of the season. The Sky Classic category champions were Pascal Egli from Switzerland and GBs Holly Page.

Sky Extra mixed races that were formerly known as Sky Ultra and Sky Extreme. These races were over 50 km long with 6.5% average elevation and 1,000m difference of min/max. altitude. The Sky Extra took into account the best four results of the season and was won by Pere Aurell of Spain and America's Hillary Gerardi.

Overall - all athletes scoring points in any race entered the overall ranking. Their best two results in each category counted for the final ranking.

Previous overall champions 
That is the results of the singles races of the various years.

Past events champions

Races

Races multiple winners

Men

Women

See also
 Vertical Kilometer World Circuit

References

External links
 International Skyrunning Federation
 Skyrunner World Series

 
World Series
Sports competition series
Syrunning
Recurring sporting events established in 2002